This is a list of automotive assembly plants in the United States.

General Motors Company

Ford Motor Company

Stellantis

Tesla

Rivian

Lucid Motors

Toyota Motor Corporation

Honda Motor Company

Nissan Motor Company

Mazda Motor Corporation

Subaru Corporation

Hyundai Motor Company

Kia Motors

Volkswagen Group

Volvo Cars

BMW Group

Mercedes-Benz Group AG

Hino Motors

See also
Automotive industry in the United States
List of former automotive manufacturing plants

References

Automotive industry in the United States